Fukuoka University is a private research university located in Fukuoka, Japan.

The university has nine faculties with a total of around 20,000 students, 800 of whom are foreign. Its two campuses are in Nanakuma and Kitakyushu. Fukuoka University Hospital is one of Japan's top hospitals.

The university has various alumni active in medical science, healthcare science, public health, life science and research.

Organization

Faculties
 Medicine
 Pharmaceutical sciences
 Engineering
 Architecture

Graduate schools
 Medicine
 Pharmaceutical sciences
 Physical education
 Law
 Science
 Engineering

Access 
 Fukudai-Mae bus stop
 Fukudaimae Station (Fukuoka Subway Nanakuma Line)

Famous alumni 
Yuya Uemura (born 1994) - professional wrestler

See also
:ja:福岡大学 for more photographs

References

External links

Official site 

Buildings and structures in Fukuoka
Private universities and colleges in Japan
Universities and colleges in Fukuoka Prefecture